Ancuaque is a small Aymara town in Chile. It is situated in the highlands of the Tarapacá Region (Chile), located 37 km from Colchane and 10 km from Cariquima. Its inhabitants live from agriculture, livestock, crafts and tourism.

Tourism 
Ancuaque is located on the slopes of Nevado Cariquima or Mama Huanapa, in addition, through the thakhinaka patha route, you can cross the Sillajhuay mountain range, reaching the town of Lirima.

References 

Populated places in Chile
Populated places in Tarapacá Region